Beylikdüzü is a station on the Istanbul Metrobus Bus rapid transit line. It is located on the D.100 state highway, with entrances/exits on both sides of the road.

Beylikdüzü station was opened on 19 July 2012 as part of the westward expansion of the line.

References

External links
Beylikdüzü station
Beylikdüzü in Google Street View

Istanbul Metrobus stations
2012 establishments in Turkey
Beylikdüzü